The Campeonato Paulista de Futebol Feminino (Paulista Women's Football Championship, in English) is the women's football state championship of São Paulo State, and is contested since 1987.

Format

There is no predetermined format for the competition, changing almost every year.

The 2001 edition became notorious as "one of the most discriminatory sports championships ever". Organisers controversially excluded all players with what were perceived as unattractive qualities such as being over 23 years old, having short hair or dark skin.

In 2004, the competition was contested by 32 teams, divided in eight groups of four teams each. The two best placed teams of each group qualified for the second round, which was contested by 16 teams divided into four groups composed of four teams each. Again, the two best placed teams qualified for the third round, which was contested between eight teams, divided into two groups of four teams each. The two best teams of each group qualified for the fourth round, which was composed of a single group of four teams. The first two teams of this group qualified for the final. The competition was contested in single leg matches.

In 2005, the competition was contested by 16 teams, divided into four groups of four teams each, playing against each other once. The two best teams of each group qualified for the next round. The teams eliminated in the first round played relegation playoffs, over two legs. The second round was composed of two groups of four teams each, playing in two leg matches. The two best placed teams of each group qualified for the third round, which were semifinal matches over two legs. The winners of these matches qualified for the final, played as a single match.

List of champions

Following is the list with all recognized titles of Campeonato Paulista Feminino:

Titles by team

Teams in bold stills active.

By city

External links
Campeonato Paulista Feminino de Futebol at RSSSF
FPF

References

Paulista de Futebol Feminino
Women